The Seocho-dong public restroom murder case, commonly known as the Gangnam Station murder case or the Gangnam Station femicide occurred at the public restroom of a karaoke bar in Seocho-gu, Seoul, South Korea on 17 May 2016. Kim Seong-min (34 years old) stabbed to death an unspecified woman he had never met before, and later claimed that he did so out of his hatred for women as they had ignored and humiliated him all his life. The police later refuted his claims and said the incident was not a hate crime against women, as claimed, but one driven by mental illness. On 13 April 2017, the Supreme Court of the Republic of Korea finalized the sentence of 30 years in prison for the murderer Kim Seong-min.

Incident 
Kim Seong-min, a 34-year-old employee of a nearby liquor store near Gangnam Station in Seoul, entered the karaoke bar's toilet in Seocho-dong, Seocho-gu, Seoul, at about 0:33 am on 17 May 2016. A 23-year-old woman, who entered the restroom at 1:07 am, was stabbed in the left chest four times with a kitchen knife measuring 32.5cm in length. The attacker testified that he committed the crime because he was ignored by women and he wasn't acquainted with the victim.

Investigation 
Immediately after being arrested, Kim Seong-min testified that he had often been ignored by women and committed the murder because he could not take it anymore. On 19 May, Seoul Seocho Police Station announced that "On 18 May, Kim's mother was summoned and confirmed the medical records and medical records that Kim has been treated for a chronic illness since 2008. Kim was hospitalized four times due to his mental illness and was diagnosed by his physician at the time of discharge in early January 2016 that he could experience further episodes if he did not take the medicine that had been prescribed to him. Despite this, he did not take any medication since he got away from home at the end of March 2016." In addition, they said, "In-depth analysis of Kim's feelings and attitudes at the present stage is needed." On 19 May and 20 May, 5 profilers including the National Police Agency criminal behavior analysis team leader Il Yong Kwon were put in to conduct psychological analysis with Kim two times.

On 22 May, Seoul Seocho Police Station announced the results of the suspect's psychological analysis. He had repeated sitting and standing since adolescence, told the surrounding people that "I can hear someone swearing at me" from 2003 to 2007 and when he went to a seminary in 2014, he got an idea that "I am trying to do my best, but I think that women keep me in check and harass me". He has a delusion that he has been hurt by women. However, there were no specific cases in which he was injured by women. In fact, due to this delusion, he was diagnosed with schizophrenia in 2008 and was admitted to the psychiatric department six times in total. Since 2008, he had lost his basic self-care function, with no washing for more than a year. Kim, however, stopped taking drugs after being discharged from the hospital in early January 2016 due to no awareness of his mental illness, and had become delusional at the time of the crime.

In particular, the Seoul Seocho Police Station responded to Kim's decision to commit the crime, saying, "On 5 May, Kim was criticized for his hygiene at the restaurant where he was serving and moved to the kitchen assistant on 7 May. Even though there was no person who pointed out the hygiene problems directly to Kim, he thought women slandered him from behind. It is seen as the background of the crime." Regarding the socially controversial issue of female abomination, Kim said in an interview with the police, "I have no antipathy toward ordinary women and I am not a misogynist. There were times when I was also popular with women and there were women who liked me. The crime was due to the actual damage that women have done to me." In addition, he talked about the phenomenon of women's loathing on the internet, "I think it's childish of young people, and I'm different from them," and he spoke of the specifics of the actual damage the women inflicted on him, "women beat me on the shoulder in the subway, deliberately blocking my way and walking slowly to make me late. And women throw me a cigarette butt on me. I've endured all these trivial but unpleasant things, and I felt I couldn't stand them any longer because they had bothered me even at my work place. I thought I'd die if I stayed like this, so I thought I'd kill first. I couldn't bear to be hurt." The police decided that Kim's attitude was a delusional paradox with no clear evidence or case and announced, "He firmly believes in vague feelings and thoughts that he has been victimized by women. And his way of speaking is 'it's certain because I can feel it.' He committed a crime with deliberate accidents without directly relating to the motive of the crime or the victim. It is a characteristic of motiveless crime that the plan is not systematic compared to the purpose such as not escaping the very next day and not getting rid of the evidence but coming to the restaurant and being arrested without real plan or preparation for arrest."

Profiler Il-yong Kwon who investigated the suspect, pointed out that the case was "a crime committed by a delusion of persecution" of the suspect suffering from schizophrenia, and that the delusion of the suspect "is not necessarily manifested only in women, but entirely hostile to the actions of others." However, he said that the aggressiveness of patients with schizophrenia is "most often expressed toward a person who is relatively vulnerable." He also said, "such schizophrenia itself is not what destroys all life. Even though he/she suffers from schizophrenia, he/she sometimes shows systematic behavior in order to achieve what he or she wants." He explained that even crime of schizophrenia can be planned systematically.

Before the second psychological interview on 20 May, on 19 May, interrogation of the suspect before arrest (real examination of warrant) was held and a warrant for arrest was issued by Seoul Central District Court because the crime was serious and Kim may run away or destroy evidence.

On 24 May at 8:30 am, the suspect who came out of the Seocho Police Station in Seoul, boarded a convoy without answering the questionnaires of the reporters. At 8:55 am, he stopped at the entrance before proceeding to field verification at the karaoke toilet near the exit 10 of Gangnam Station in Seocho-gu, Seoul, where he committed the crime and told the reporters "I am calm now. I do not have any personal grudge or feelings about the victim, and I am sorry that she had been sacrificed anyway." About the motive of the crime, he said, "I spoke during the process of investigation and I will talk about it in the course of the trial." On this day, on-site verification was conducted for 30 minutes from 9 am with a final check by the suspect alone to reproduce process of crime from beginning to end.

Trial 
In a decision-making trial on 30 September 2016, the prosecution sought life imprisonment for the suspect and requested 20 years of medical care and an order to attach an ankle monitor. The Seoul Central District Court sentenced the suspect to 30 years in prison on 14 October. The Seoul High Court's Criminal Department 2 rejected both the prosecution and the defendant's appeals in an appeals court held on 12 January 2017, maintaining a 30-year prison term handed down by the first trial. The Supreme Court upheld a 30-year prison term handed down by the plaintiff to the defendant, Kim, in an appeal on 13 April 2017.

Remembrance Movement and Conflict 
At the suggestion of a netizen, the victim's memorial campaign began and exit 10 of Gangnam Station, close to the scene of the incident, was posted with post-it notes pointing to misogyny issues such as "female hate is a social problem" and "women who remain will make a better world." Social controversy arose over the issue of misogyny, with post-its and flowers for remembrance expressing their condolences for the victims at the site of Exit 10 of Gangnam Station. Meanwhile, some posts posted on SNS claiming that interpreting the case as a misogynistic crime is a leap of logic such as "Women with victim mentality are over-expanding the case," "Are we supposed to be treated as potential criminals just because we're men?" A wreath with a ribbon, which read "Don't forget the soldiers of Cheonan Ship who died because they were men," arrived on 19 May at Gangnam Station, but the ribbon was then blocked by a memorial post-it by citizen in memory of the victim, and eventually the ribbon was removed.

On 20 May, a man wearing a pink elephant mask at Exit 10 of Gangnam Station said, "It's not that carnivores are bad, it's that animals that commit crimes ... Zootopia without prejudice. "We are making it together, men and women of the Republic of Korea, which is currently number one in security in the world, but is safer." Some female mourners tried to remove the mask, saying, "If you're not a member of Ilbe, take it off with dignity." Seocho Police were called to the police station as a physical confrontation took place and eventually to end the situation. The Ilbe Storehouse reportedly posted an article predicting that he would "wear a mask and go to the memorial site." On the afternoon of 21 May, hundreds of mourners took part in a memorial march to and from Gangnam Station and the scene of the incident, and members of the Ilbe Reservoir showed up at the event, arguing with the mourners. Fearing conflict, dozens of police were deployed to the scene.

Controversies

Misogyny 
Unlike the positions of the administrative departments, such as investigative agencies, some experts from opposition parties, academia and civic groups expressed their opinion that mental illness and misogyny are not exclusive, and that there is a possibility that it is both a crime of mental illness and a crime of misogyny. The Seoul Metropolitan Police Agency also said the previous day that it concluded that Kim's case was a "don't ask questions" caused by his persecutory delusion schizophrenia, based on a comprehensive analysis of Kim's psychology through two meetings on 19 and 20 July. They say that regardless of the nature of the crime, the reaction of women and men to the case itself is important because it reflects the current state of politics, society.

Professor Oh Yoon-seong explained, "From the perspective of the victims, we chose a weak partner, which is called a woman," and "nothing more than that." "I think there's a local symbolism," he said. "There are a lot of young couples coming and going (the chair) and I think they've been stressed out, and I think they have any special feelings for the Gangnam area," he said. "Even though this person is said to have a history of mental illness, if he thought about not being arrested by the police, he could continue to be satisfied." "To solve this problem, it's an unspecified number of crimes that choose as a way to relieve their stress when they don't find something to solve," he said. "To solve that problem, it's a kind of way for our society as a whole to pay attention to those people and solve the negative aspects through communication." "There is a danger that women's misogyny can be put to the fore," she said. "The concept of a confrontation between sexes is under considerable stress now that some people call it a misogyny crime," adding, "It is not desirable for society to be swayed by a single criminal statement." "The primary reason is that there are quite a few young women in and out of the area (Gangnam Station)," said a memorial event related to Gangnam Station. "I believe that I can be that person, and that kind of psychological panic is spreading.”

The 20th National Assembly president-elect of the Democratic Party, along with Pyo Chang-won, who once served as a profiler, said, "It is clear that it is a crime against unrelated women, including the history of the chair's mental illness," but added, "It is also true that there is a twisted male-centered subculture represented by Ilbe and Soranet." Meanwhile, he expressed his opposition to the politicization of crimes on the murder case at Gangnam Station.

In a commentary, the Labor Party, an outside party, described the case as a "female hate crime," while "do not ask" refers to crimes characterized by impulsive acts of abuse against an unspecified person. The murder at Gangnam Station was neither directed nor impulsive toward an "unspecified majority." He chose the location of the crime, and waited for "women" to come in for more than an hour. And the motive for the crime, 'for being ignored by a woman,' proves that the case is not a 'killer' but a murder due to misogyny. Denying and not taking countermeasures against misogyny crimes can lead to another similar misogyny crime.

Hong Seong-soo, a law professor at Sookmyung Women's University, said the case is not just about "anyone" but about "anyone among women," so it is not too much to be seen as a misogyny case. Hong said, "Now that the subject of the crime was a matter of "anyone" versus "anyone of women," I think it's safe to see the case as a misogyny crime. The problem of these crimes should be taken seriously. Based on unjustified anger, crimes are often brutal. The members of the group are terrified to target all groups. If it is "don't ask questions" targeting unspecified people, the scope of potential victims will be broadened, which is unlikely to be considered a "my problem." However, if there are frequent crimes against a certain group, such as women, foreigners and sexual minorities, it becomes a 'my problem' for the members of the group.”

Bang Yi-seul of the Korea Sexual Violence Counseling Center said, "It is rather out of touch with reality to see the case as irrelevant to misogyny through the identity of the perpetrator, because the original misogyny itself is not done on a logical basis, but only because it is a woman."

Seo Cheon-seok, a psychiatrist for youth psychiatry, said, "The symptoms of mental illness are in the social context," adding, "The problem is that he said he committed crimes 'because women ignored me.' It has a social context and it is 'female disgust,'" he pointed out. "In the past authoritarian dictatorship, many Cho Hyun-byung patients complained of hearing, telling me that the Central Intelligence Agency was following me and eavesdropping," and saying, "In the late 1980s, the CIA should pay attention to the emergence of "female hatred" as in the late 2000s, and that if a woman-hating consciousness is developing into a symptom of mental illness, this kind of change in society as a whole." Or is this the cause of the suspicion?' We have to stop this low-level debate." As for public reaction, "The reason this case became a big issue is not because of what one criminal said, but because of the dangerous reality in our society where the crime took place. Women are not safe, as the percentage of victims in violent incidents is eight times more than that of men," he said.

Professor Bae Eun-kyung of the sociology department at Seoul National University said, "If the incident was caused by real schizophrenia, it shows the unconsciousness that misogyny worked," adding, "The aggression shown in irrational and irrational thinking shows the unconscious structure facing women."

Lee Woong-hyeok, a professor of police administration at Konkuk University, explained both cases of misogyny crime and the combination of two factors: misogyny and mental illness. Lee first explained that police did not believe the suspect was targeted at women because they did not believe it was credible. However, if the motive for targeting women is true, it could be seen as a hate crime," he said. "When I approach a woman in social life, I think I'm being ostracized, or because I had this kind of emotional shock, I think there was a problem in my mental judgment. If so, it clearly has a slightly different nature to view this as a mere pattern of motorized crime, so-called "questionless crime," that has occurred so far. Because there has been a lot of the so-called hate, demeaning expressions and moods for women in our society recently. For example, 'Kimchi girl' or 'Doenjang Girl' and a number of other disparaging expressions, it clearly had vague hatred and hatred of women by some excluded and marginalized men." As to the growing impact of the incident, he said, "For now, I think it could be interpreted that most women share a lot of sympathy with this case. "I feel like I'm joining in remembrance in this sense, with a sense of empathy for enough victims, and for women's social and structural discriminatory treatment, wage structure and other socio-economic positions," he said.

Lee Soo-jeong, a criminal psychology professor at Kyonggi University who sees the "targeted women" statement itself as "not credible," said after interviewing the assailant, "The level of schizophrenia was so severe that it was so difficult to make realistic judgments during schizophrenia that it was almost impossible to make a realistic judgment on a particular group of people." "It was an attack on something that looked weaker than yourself in hallucinations or oblivion, not a misogyny crime," she asserted. It also stressed "poor management of the mentally ill." On the other hand, the drug-induced psychosis treatment was more effective than expected and suggested that "if someone had kept taking the drug now, it would not have happened now."

Lee Na-young, a sociology professor at Chung-Ang University, diagnosed it as "not a direct hate crime, but I think it can be seen as a crime caused by disgust imprinted on unconsciousness." She also assessed how people accepted the case rather than whether an individual felt misogyny and killed it. She said it should look in the context of why the public has taken issue with the crime of misogyny, with many responding to the campaign to post a memorial note and criticize misogyny.

Some say the move is only natural when women are relatively weak in a male-dominated society. "This case is a crime based on innocent women's sacrifice and misogyny," Shin Kwang-young said "This could be an opportunity for us to strongly demand a new social-level awareness and response to misogyny because of the campaign." Shin said "Seeing this move as an overreaction means that the Gender-aware education has not been done properly,” "The entire Korean society is male-dominated. Language violence, physical violence, and even murder are occurring based on misogyny, although they differ. It can be seen as a matter of society, not of individuals anymore," he stressed. "Public hate speech and crime against foreigners, women and minorities should be punished through legislation," he said. "We should also strengthen the perception that it is a serious crime through education."

Mental health stigma 
Medical workers have voiced concerns about the crime being dismissed as a matter of 'mental illness'. In a Korean study from 2019, crime rates of persons with schizophrenia were lower than the general population in most types of crimes, however the prevalence of murder was about five times higher, "suggesting a need for closer and more appropriate care for the population."

Crime vulnerability in public toilet 
It was pointed out that the case occurred in men's and women's public bathrooms without door locks or locks were relatively vulnerable to crime. Rep. Pyo Chang-won, president-elect of the National Assembly, said, "The excessive crime risk sensitivity promoted by the government, which emphasizes unsafe environmental design (such as public restrooms) and advanced security countries, is also a part of the problem."

References

Deaths by stabbing in South Korea
2016 murders in South Korea